Gunnar Lemvigh (28 March 1909 – 16 November 1979) was a Danish film actor. He appeared in 52 films between 1939 and 1977.

Filmography

 Familien Gyldenkål vinder valget (1977)
 Agent 69 Jensen i Skorpionens tegn (1977)
 Slap af (1973)
 Her bor de gale (1973)
 Manden på Svanegården (1972)
 Takt og tone i himmelsengen (1972)
 Kommunisten (1971)
 The Only Way (1970)
 Rend mig i revolutionen (1970)
 Tango jalousi (1970)
 Mig og min lillebror og Bølle (1969)
 Ta' lidt solskin (1969)
 Farlig sommer (1969)
 Romulus den store (1969)
 Mig og min lillebror og storsmuglerne (1968)
 Far laver sovsen (1967)
 Brødrene på Uglegaarden (1967)
 Min søsters børn på bryllupsrejse (1967)
 Smukke-Arne og Rosa (1967)
 Det er ikke appelsiner, det er heste (1967)
 Min søsters børn (1966)
 Nu stiger den (1966)
 Dyden går amok (1966)
 I brændingen (1965)
 Mille, Marie og mig. Eller Giselle eller? (1965)
 En ven i bolignøden (1965)
 Don Olsen kommer til byen (1964)
 Fem mand og Rosa (1964)
 Mord for åbent tæppe (1964)
 The Keeler Affair (1963)
 Bussen (1963)
 Venus fra Vestø (1962)
 Det støver stadig (1962)
 Det tossede paradis (1962)
 Far til fire med fuld musik (1961)
 Gøngehøvdingen (1961)
 Støv på hjernen (1961)
 Min kone fra Paris (1961)
 Ullabella (1961)
 Ud med post (1961)
 Lyssky transport gennem Danmark (1958)
 Fra den gamle Købmandsgaard (1951)
 Kampen mod uretten (1949)
 Næste gang er det dig (1948)
 Kristinus Bergman (1948)
 Far betaler (1946)
 Billet mrk. (1946)
 Mens sagføreren sover (1945)
 Mine kære koner (1943)
 Erik Ejegods pilgrimsfærd (1943)
 I de gode, gamle dage (1940)
 En lille tilfældighed (1939)

External links

1909 births
1979 deaths
Danish male film actors
Male actors from Copenhagen
20th-century Danish male actors